Grevillea wiradjuri is a shrub of the family Proteaceae native to the New South Wales western slopes.

References

wiradjuri
Proteales of Australia
Flora of New South Wales
Taxa named by Robert Owen Makinson